The WS-I Basic Profile (official abbreviation is BP), a specification from the Web Services Interoperability industry consortium (WS-I), provides interoperability guidance for core Web Services specifications such as SOAP, WSDL, and UDDI. The profile uses Web Services Description Language (WSDL) to enable the description of services as sets of endpoints operating on messages.

To understand the importance of WSI-BP, note that it defines a much narrower set of valid services than the full WSDL or SOAP schema. Many common platforms (listed below) support WSI-BP but do not support services outside of it. Compare the WSDL 1.1 specification to the subset permitted in WSI-BP.  Also note that WSI-BP generally narrows the SOAP specification.  There is a notable exception where WSI expands on the SOAP standard, and that is in adding xml:lang attribute on fault elements.

Versions
Version 1.0 of this profile was released in early 2004.
Version 1.1 published in 2006 does not have the same scope as version 1.0. The part of version 1.0 dealing with serialization of envelopes and their representation in messages has been moved to a new profile called Simple Soap Binding Profile (SSBP)
Version 1.2 was finalized in November 2010. The main new features are the support for MTOM binary attachments and WS-Addressing
Version 2.0 was also published in November 2010. It uses SOAP 1.2, UDDI 3 and WS-Addressing

Compliant framework

Here is a list of frameworks claiming to be compliant with this profile :
SAP - Sybase Unwired Platform 
Oracle Weblogic Server 10.3 is Basic Profile compliant as well as WS-I Basic Security Profile compliant 
ASP.NET 2.0 - Web Services are Basic Profile compliant 
Microsoft BizTalk Server 
Eclipse Metro, the bundle including the JAX-WS Reference Implementation (JAX-WS RI) and the Tango (WSIT) project.
IBM WebSphere Application Server Version 5.0.2 to 5.1 are BP 1.0 compliant version 6.0+ are BP 1.1 compliant 
Apache Axis 1.2+ is BP 1.0 compliant 
Apache Axis2
Celtix
gSOAP is BP 1.0a, 1.1, and 1.2 compliant
Software AG webMethods version 7 and 8
JBossWS
Codehaus XFire
Apache CXF, the merger of Codehaus XFire and Celtix
Gosu, the Gosu language inherently supports WS-I webservices as native types.
Cordys
SpringWS

External links
WS-I Basic Profile 1.0 Specification
WS-I Basic Profile 1.1 Specification
WS-I Basic Profile 1.2 Specification
WS-I Basic Profile 2.0 Specification
WSDL 1.1 Specification

Web service specifications
Interoperability